This is a detailed list of transactions during the 2003-04 NBA season.

Retirements

Trades

Draft

First round

Second round

Previous years' draftees

External links
 NBA Transactions at NBA.com
 2003-04 NBA Transactions| Basketball-Reference.com

References

Transactions
2003-04